Pirooz Kalayeh (born 11 July 1976) is an Iranian-American film director, screenwriter, and writer. He is known for The Human War (2011), Shoplifting from American Apparel (2012), Brad Warner's Hardcore Zen (2013) and Zombie Bounty Hunter M.D. (2015).

Early life 
Kalayeh was born in Tehran, Iran and emigrated to LaFayette, Indiana shortly before the Islamic Revolution. His family settled in Hockessin, Delaware, where he attended high school. Later, he attended The University of Delaware for his undergraduate degree, and then obtained an MFA in creative writing from The Jack Kerouac School. He has been making films since he was 12 years old.

Career 
Kalayeh's early interest was in music and he sang for Cecil’s Water, playing with The Toasters, Ruder Than You, Spindrift, and The Verge.

In 2005, he moved to Los Angeles and began working as an Associate Producer for Weller Grossman Productions.

In 2008, Pirooz left Hollywood for a two-year exploration of South Korea, where he produced Transistor Radio with musical group The Slipshod Swingers, interviewed artists and filmmakers on his blog Shikow, and wrote the screenplay that would lead to his eventual return stateside for a directorial debut.

In 2012, Pirooz's first feature SHOPLIFTING FROM AMERICAN APPAREL was released by Indie Screen and played to select theaters across America. The film received mixed reviews for its meta-approach: Benoit Lelievre extolled the film for requiring "every bit of your wits" and not being a "sit-and-watch, turn-your-brain-off movie"; VICE criticized the film "as a total lack of substance covered up with gimmicks"; The Village Voice commented that "Kalayeh and co. can be credited with capturing much of the tone of the novella".

His documentary feature about Buddhist teacher Brad Warner BRAD WARNER’S HARDCORE ZEN (2013) premiered at the Buddhist Film Festival in Amsterdam on 5 October 2013, and played in select theaters across the United States and Europe, and was featured in major Buddhist publications and city papers, such as Lion's Roar, The Daily Camera, and Nomos Journal.

THE HUMAN WAR (2011) was co-produced and co-directed by Pirooz Kalayeh and Thomas Henwood and premiered at the Beloit International Film Festival on 21 February 2014. The film received a Best Screenplay Award and played in double screenings across America with Hardcore Zen.

ZOMBIE BOUNTY HUNTER M.D. premiered at On Vous Ment Film Festival in Lyon, France on 24 May 2016.

Coinciding with his professional work in film and television, Pirooz has continued to teach screenwriting, cinema studies, creative writing, acting, and film production courses to a diverse array of students around the globe, including UCLA Extension, The American Musical and Dramatic Academy, and Yonsei University. He is currently an assistant professor of Cinema Studies and Video Production at Monroe Community College.

Filmography

References

External links 
 Film Label Website 
 Director Website 
 Director's Blog 
 hitsreverything 
 IMDB 

1976 births
Living people
American film directors
American male screenwriters
Iranian emigrants to the United States
Naropa University alumni
State University of New York faculty
University of Delaware alumni